Sheikh Meshal bin Hamad Al Thani is the State of Qatar ambassador to the United States of America.

Education 
Al Thani earned a Master’s degree in international relations from the American University in Washington, DC.

Diplomatic career 
Al Thani started his diplomatic career in May 1997 at the Department of European and American Affairs at the Ministry of Foreign Affairs where he stayed until August 1998. Following his service at the Ministry of Foreign Affairs he joined the Qatari Mission to the UN in New York, where he remained till September 2000. From October 2000 to October 2004, he served as a member of the Qatari diplomatic mission in Washington D.C. In November 2004 he became a member of the Qatari diplomatic mission in the Belgian capital, where he acted as the Qatari Liaison with NATO. After his service as Ambassador of Qatar to Brussel, from October 2007 to July 2011, Al Thani served as the Permeant Representative of the State of Qatar to the United Nations till October 2013. The next three years he was the Qatari Ambassador to France. Since 2016, Al Thani has been the ambassador of the State of Qatar to the United States of America.

On 15 January 2021, Al Thani launched the Qatar-USA 2021 Year of Culture as the host of a concert with the Minister of Culture and Sports of Qatar Salah bin Ghanem Al Ali and Greta C. Holtz, Chargé d’affaires of the United States Embassy in Qatar. This concert marked the start of a year of special curated exhibitions and bilateral exchanges in both countries. In the same month Al Thani received the Medal of Distinguished Public Service from the United States Department of Defense.

He is a member of the Metropolitan Club of the City of Washington DC.

Publications 
 The World Cup gave Qatar an opportunity to enhance worker protections, The Washington Post, 2022
 Qatar's Ambassador on why the Middle East deserves the opportunity to host soccer's biggest event, CNN, 2022

Personal life 
Al Thani is married with three children.

References

20th-century births
Living people
Year of birth missing (living people)
Ambassadors of Qatar to the United States
American University alumni